Cedarville University is a private Baptist university in Cedarville, Ohio. It is chartered by the state of Ohio, approved by the Ohio Board of Regents, and accredited by the Higher Learning Commission.

Established in 1887, the school was originally affiliated with the conservative Reformed Presbyterian Church in North America, General Synod, now known as the Presbyterian Church in America. Since 2003, Cedarville is affiliated with the State Convention of Baptists in Ohio (Southern Baptist Convention).

History

1800s and 1900s
Cedarville College was chartered in 1887 by the New Light Reformed Presbyterian Church; at the time, the surrounding township was largely Presbyterian. The first classes were held in 1892, though the college did not officially open until 1894. David McKinney was the college's first president.

After McKinney, Wilbert McChesney served as president from 1915 to 1940. McChesney guided the college during World War I and the Depression, and also served as professor of New Testament when the Reformed Presbyterian Seminary was located at Cedarville. In addition to his duties at Cedarville, McChesney served seven terms in the Ohio Legislature.

Walter Smith Kilpatrick replaced McChesney in 1940 and served until 1943. He is the only alumnus of the college (1934) to serve as president, having graduated with honors. Kilpatrick's brief tenure faced financial challenges and the impact of World War II.

Ira Vayhinger became the college's fourth president in 1943 and served until 1950. He had served as general secretary of the local YMCA from 1911–1922. He joined Cedarville College in 1941 as finance director and business manager. As president, he guided the college through enrollment challenges and the difficult years of World War II.

E. H. Miller was appointed president in 1950. During his tenure, in 1953, the college merged with the Baptist Bible Institute of Cleveland. Following the unanimous vote of both boards of trustees, the transfer of property occurred April 4, 1953. Miller's tenure as president ended in 1953.

Leonard Webster, the dean of the Baptist Bible Institute of Cleveland, became president of Cedarville College in 1953. In 1953, the Baptist Bible Institute of Cleveland, Ohio, relocated to Cedarville's campus and transitioned into management of Cedarville College through a merger arrangement with the college's Presbyterian board of trustees, who each resigned in turn. The Baptists were affiliated with the General Association of Regular Baptist Churches. Webster led the move from Cleveland to Cedarville and hired new faculty to complement the existing Baptist Bible Institute professors. Webster represented Cedarville at national and state conferences of the Regular Baptist Churches to promote the college.

James T. Jeremiah, Cedarville College's seventh president, began his tenure in 1954 and served until 1978. Under Jeremiah's leadership, Cedarville College transformed to an accredited institution of higher learning. College enrollment increased to over 1,200 during Jeremiah's tenure by the mid-1970s. The Jeremiah Chapel in the Dixon Ministry Center is named in honor of Jeremiah. David Jeremiah, his son, is a noted alumnus and a former Cedarville trustee.

Paul H. Dixon became the eighth president of Cedarville College in 1978. During the 25 years that Dixon served as president, Cedarville constructed $100 million in facilities and expanded from 180 to 400 acres.

2000s
In 2002, it became a university.  In 2003, it became affiliated with the State Convention of Baptists in Ohio.  Enrollment increased from 1,185 students in 1978 to more than 3,000 by the end of Dixon's service in 2003.

Cedarville's ninth president, William E. Brown, took office in 2003. Under his leadership, the university developed new online programs and launched the Pharm.D., M.S.N., M.B.A., and now-defunct M.Ed. programs. The campus expanded to include the Center for Biblical and Theological Studies and Health Sciences Center and renovated 14 residence halls. Yet, mid-way through his tenure, President Brown experienced controversies regarding the lack of collegiality among Bible professors and the allegiance to the school's doctrinal statement, leading to the terminations of some professors, most notably, David Hoffeditz and Michael Pahl.  As a result of ongoing problems, President Brown announced his resignation in October 2012. In January 2013,  Inside Higher Ed characterized the university as being in the midst of an "ongoing, tangled doctrinal controversy." Vice President for Student Life Carl Ruby resigned for undisclosed reasons in January 2013. Due to lack of interest, the board of trustees eliminated Cedarville's philosophy major at the end of the academic year.

In 2006, the General Association of Regular Baptist Churches terminated its relationship with the school due to the partnership with the Southern Baptist Convention and perceived liberalism in this convention. 

Brown left his position as president in July 2013, instead becoming the university's chancellor, an office he held until July 2014.  Thomas White became the 10th president of Cedarville in July 2013. Under White's leadership, the university completed an extensive renovation of the Jeremiah Chapel, built new science laboratories, established two additional graduate programs, and founded the Center for Biblical Apologetics and Public Christianity.

In December 2013, following policy changes made by President White, twenty-year associate professor of Christian education Joy Fagan resigned, saying she felt that she was no longer a good fit for the university. White claimed that his policies were in line with Cedarville's past values and Scripture, and were "not a new shift." In early 2014, White said that university was preparing to codify their complementarian stance concerning gender roles and re-wrote the school's doctrinal statement to reflect the change. According to 100: Cedarville College, A Century of Commitment by J. Murray Murdoch, the first doctrinal statement adopted by then-Cedarville College made no mention of gender roles or complementarian theology.

From 2010-2014, an independent student newspaper titled The Ventriloquist was written by students and publicly distributed on campus without authorization. The publication often reported alternative perspectives about the institutional changes and had published LGBT-sympathetic content.  In April 2014, President White and Vice President of Student Life Jon Wood confiscated copies of the newspaper as students waited outside the chapel to distribute it.  According to The Ventriloquist, White stated that permission was required to distribute the newspaper. After this incident, The Ventriloquist was moved online, where new articles continued to be published for about a year.

In the spring of 2017, White and then-Academic Vice President Loren Reno instituted what they called the "Philippians 4:8 Policy", which they claimed provided biblically consistent guidelines for faculty to follow but which some professors claimed amounted to censorship and the loss of academic freedom. They later changed the policy title to the "Biblically Consistent Curriculum (BCC) Policy," after two veteran Bible professors objected to this interpretation and application of Philippians 4:8. The policy is still in place today, serving to regulate the literature, art, films, and other media that faculty are permitted to use in the classroom.

The university's seal has remained essentially unchanged from the Presbyterians' original design and still contains the Latin phrase "Pro Corona et Foedere Christi", which is translated, "For the crown and covenant of Christ". The original seal is surrounded with a slogan adopted by the former Baptist Bible Institute, "For the Word of God and the Testimony of Jesus Christ".

Academics

Cedarville University offers more than 150 programs of study, which cover most areas of the liberal arts, the sciences, professional programs, and theological studies. It also offers over 50 minors, including a five-class Bible minor, which all students are required to take. The university awards graduate degrees in the areas of nursing (M.S.N.), business (M.B.A.), ministry (M.Min. and M.Div.) and pharmacy (Pharm.D.). Cedarville is accredited by the Higher Learning Commission.

The university launched a School of Pharmacy in 2009 with 52 students beginning a three-year pre-pharmacy curriculum, and the four-year professional graduate program (Doctor of Pharmacy) launched in 2012.  The program is accredited by the Accreditation Council for Pharmacy Education.  The Doctor of Pharmacy degree is the university's only doctoral degree and provides patient care services and student education through Cedar Care Pharmacy and the Center for Pharmacy Innovation.

In 2022, Cedarville changed the name of the School of Business Administration, to the Robert W. Plaster School of Business (PSB). As a consequence of a donation from the Robert Plaster Foundation and other donations from individuals, the newly branded PSB is housed in the business building next to the Stevens Student Center. 

The university employs more than 200 faculty in several academic departments and the schools of engineering, education, business, pharmacy, nursing, and biblical and theological studies.  Academic faculty are required to commit to "biblical integration in and out of the classroom" and must be born-again Christians.

Spiritual life

According to its mission statement, the university is "a Christ-centered learning community equipping students for lifelong leadership and service through an education marked by excellence and grounded in biblical truth." All students are required to earn a 15 credit hour Bible minor and attend weekday chapel services on-campus in the Dixon Ministry Center. Students are also encouraged to participate in various community service and ministry programs off campus.

Discipleship groups (D-groups) also feature a prominent role on campus. The purpose of d-groups is to facilitate a more accountable form of small-group ministry. A discipleship group of the same gender meets once a week to go through a book of the Bible or Christian book. After a year of being in a d-group, individuals can apply to be a d-group leader.

Campus

The university's original campus and facilities are located in the village of Cedarville. Since about 1970, the school has purchased and consolidated surrounding farmlands which now total approximately 400 acres to the north and west of the village.  Among the few turn-of-the-century structures is Founders Hall (Old Main), which houses the president's office and administrative functions.

Students are strongly encouraged to live on-campus, and about 80% do so. Those who choose to reside on campus live in single-sex residence halls. The university has eleven residence buildings for men and eleven for women, all with co-ed lounges. Some halls group rooms in a suite-like setting, with three to four bedrooms sharing a small lounge in each unit, while others have a single-room, hall-style format with communal lounges on each floor.  Townhouses are available for upper class and graduate students.

Newer athletic facilities cover the farthest northwestern reaches of campus, including a soccer stadium and baseball/softball fields. The university created the Elvin R. King Cross Country Course in 2006, located on the north end of campus and designed to host NCAA-sanctioned, as well as All-Ohio and National Christian College Athletic Association meets.

Water tower

The water tower of Cedarville University is a landmark on the university campus in Cedarville, Ohio. First erected in 1983, the water tower underwent a $55,000 renovation in 2015. The water tower is located behind Cedarville's athletic center and bears the school's mascot, a yellow jacket named Stinger, along with the university's stylized text logo. The aesthetic elements were added in the 2015 renovation by H2O Towers of Saline, Michigan. The job was completed in four days using high-gloss paint manufactured by Tnemec. The water tower can be seen over Cedarville University by southbound drivers on Ohio 72. The tower serves as a landmark for one of the university's emergency telephones.

Controversies 
Cedarville has been criticized at a national level for its handling of alleged sexual assaults. In 2013, a student filed an anonymous federal complaint against the university for allegedly violating Title IX and mishandling her report of attempted rape. Following this complaint, the U.S. Department of Education's Office for Civil Rights opened an investigation into how Cedarville handled allegations of sexual assaults. In 2018, the chair of the university's board of trustees and White's mentor, Paige Patterson, was fired from his position at Southwestern Baptist Theological Seminary (SWBTS) for covering up a sexual assault there; he subsequently resigned from the board. The Roys Report alleged that Thomas White and his wife, Joy, aided in this cover-up during their time at the SWBTS, although White responded that he had never met the victim, and neither he nor his wife had heard of the rape.

Students have also alleged through The Roys Report that faculty and staff have failed to provide a safe environment for students, discouraged them from seeking help while experiencing suicidal ideation, and threatened retaliatory lawsuits against students for submitting Title IX complaints.

On May 1, 2020, Cedarville's board of trustees placed President White on administrative leave, stating that it had learned additional details regarding White's hiring and subsequent firing of Anthony Moore, an admitted sexual abuser. Lieutenant General (Ret.) Loren Reno was appointed acting president. While White claimed he did not know the extent of Moore's abuse, the Village Church of Fort Worth claimed to have provided him with a complete testimony at the time of Moore's hiring. In June 2020, the board reinstated White, leading to the resignation of two board members, Mark Vroegop and Danny Akin.

Publications

BBI publications
Before Baptist Bible Institute merged with Cedarville College and relocated from Cleveland, Ohio, they published Marturion (a student yearbook), and  B. B. Eye, the only known archives of which are in the Cedarville University library and in the Louisiana Serials list.

Current Cedarville publications
Cedars: news magazine and online news site by students for students (subject to the BBC policy) 
Cedarville Magazine: a publication for alumni and supporters of the university. Stories focus on the university's academics, campus life, ministries, and alumni.
The Cedarville Review: The undergraduate literary journal (subject to the BBC policy)
The Cedarville Interpreter: Independent student-run newspaper, focused on student & handbook related issues.

Athletics
Known as the Cedarville University Yellow Jackets, Cedarville competes in 16 sports. The official school colors are blue and gold. Cedarville is a dual member of two national athletics associations; the university is an NCAA Division II member as well as a member of the National Christian College Athletic Association (NCCAA). The university became a full member of NCAA Division II on July 12, 2012. In 2013 the university joined five other regional institutions to form the Great Midwest Athletic Conference.

Prior to joining the NCAA, Cedarville competed as a member of the National Association of Intercollegiate Athletics (NAIA) in the American Mideast Conference (AMC). Cedarville ended their affiliation with the NAIA after the 2010-11 academic year, after competing in the NAIA for over 60 years. The university was one of the founding members of the AMC, then known as the Mid-Ohio League, in 1949. In 2007, the women's track program placed 2nd in the nation among all NAIA divisions. Both the men's and women's basketball teams have advanced to the NAIA Division II national basketball championships.  In 2005, the men's team made it to the NAIA Division II final four, and in both 2004 and 2005 the women's team competed in the NAIA Division II championship game. Cedarville's women's sports won the American Mideast Conference (AMC) All-Sports Award for the 2004-2005 season. The women's cross country team won the school's only NAIA national title in any sport in 2001. The Lady Jackets also claimed the 2008 All-Ohio Intercollegiate Cross Country Championship which features all of the colleges and the universities in the state. They are the only NAIA program to ever win the All-Ohio women's title.

Since joining NCAA Division II, 10 Cedarville teams have competed in their respective NCAA Championships. Yellow Jacket golfer Jacob Forsyth competed in the NCAA Division II Super Regional (2013). Carsyn Koch won the 800-meter race at the NCAA Division II Track and Field Indoor and Outdoor Championships (2016, 2017)., competed at the U.S. Olympic Trials in 2016, and competed in the U.S. Outdoor National Track and Field Championships (2017). Dan Michalski won the 3,000-meter steeplechase at the NCAA Division II Track and Field Outdoor Championships (2017), becoming Cedarville's first men's NCAA Division II champion.

Men's
 Baseball
 Basketball
 Cross-country
 Golf
 Soccer
 Tennis
 Indoor track and field
 Outdoor track and field

Women's
 Basketball
 Cross-country
 Soccer
 Softball
 Tennis
 Indoor track and field
 Outdoor track and field
 Volleyball

Accreditation and involvement
Cedarville University is accredited by the Higher Learning Commission (HLC). Its professional degrees are accredited by the appropriate specialized accreditor. Cedarville University is also approved by the Ohio Department of Higher Education.

In addition, Cedarville is a member of the following organizations: 
 Association of Independent Colleges and Universities of Ohio
 Council of Colleges of Arts and Sciences
 Council of Independent Colleges
 National Association of Independent Colleges and Universities
 Ohio College Association
 Ohio Foundation of Independent Colleges
 Southwestern Ohio Council for Higher Education
 National Association of Schools of Music
 NSA National Center of Academic Excellence in Cyber Operations

Student organizations
Cedarville University offers nearly 120 different student organizations, from academic and professional, to social and service, to cross-cultural and special interest groups. The university is also home to Resound Radio, an internet radio station run through the school's communication department.

Notable alumni 
Ryan T. Anderson, American conservative political philosopher who is best known for his opposition to same-sex marriage
Abbie Cobb, actress and author
Paula Faris, American television correspondent for ABC News
Valde Garcia, member of the Michigan State Senate
David Jeremiah, author, speaker and senior pastor of the California evangelical megachurch Shadow Mountain Community Church
Mark Keough, Republican member of the Texas House of Representatives; pastor in The Woodlands
Peter A. Lillback, president of Westminster Theological Seminary and author of "George Washington's Sacred Fire"
Grace Norman, U.S. Paralympic triathlon gold medalist, and bronze medalist in 400m  in the 2016 Paralympics in Rio
DeMaurice Smith, executive director of the National Football League Players Association
Joseph M. Stowell III, president of Cornerstone University and the author of over 20 Christian books
Robert Winn, Professor of History and department chair at Northwestern College; author

References

External links
 

 
Universities and colleges affiliated with the Southern Baptist Convention
Educational institutions established in 1887
Education in Greene County, Ohio
Private universities and colleges in Ohio
Buildings and structures in Greene County, Ohio
1887 establishments in Ohio